Rubén Evaristo Fernández Real (2 May 1931 – 9 October 2015) was a footballer who played as a forward. He captained the Paraguay national team which won the 1953 South American Championship.

Career
Fernández was born in Villarrica, Paraguay. He started his career around 1946 in the youth divisions of Club Estero Bellaco in Villarrica. In 1950, he moved to Club Libertad. After winning the South American Championship with Paraguay, Fernández moved to Argentine club Boca Juniors, where he played from 1953 to 1956 and won the 1954 Argentine championship. He ended his career at San Lorenzo de Almagro, having played there from 1957 to 1958.

Personal life
After being forced to retire from football at the age of 27 due to injuries, Fernández became a dentist.

He died aged 84 on 9 October 2015 in Buenos Aires.

References

External links
 Profile at Albirroja.com 

1931 births
2015 deaths
Paraguayan footballers
Association football forwards
Club Libertad footballers
Boca Juniors footballers
San Lorenzo de Almagro footballers
Expatriate footballers in Argentina
Paraguayan expatriate footballers
Paraguay international footballers
Copa América-winning players